Richard Archibald Fortescue, 7th Earl Fortescue (14 April 1922 – 7 March 1993) was a British peer, the son of Denzil Fortescue, 6th Earl Fortescue.

He married firstly, Penelope Henderson (d. 1959) on 24 October 1949. They had two children:

Charles Hugh Richard Fortescue, 8th Earl Fortescue (b. 10 May 1951)
Lady Celia Ann Fortescue (b. 30 December 1957), married David Adams and had issue.

He married secondly, Margaret Stratton, on 3 March 1961 and they were divorced in 1987. They had two children:

Lady Laura Fortescue (b. 1 May 1962)
Lady Sarah Fortescue (b. 1963)

Lord Fortescue married thirdly, Carolyn Hill in 1989.

References

External links

1922 births
1993 deaths
Fortescue,7
Richard